The R10 was the first series of post-war New York City Subway cars. They were built by the American Car and Foundry Company from 1948 to 1949 for the IND/BMT B Division. A total of 400 cars were built, arranged as single units. Two versions were manufactured: Westinghouse (WH)-powered cars and General Electric (GE)-powered cars. The R10s introduced many innovations, including an all-welded low-alloy high tensile (LAHT) steel construction, dynamic braking, improved propulsion, and various cosmetic features.

The first R10s entered service on November 20, 1948. Various modifications were made over the years to the R10 fleet, and about 110 cars were lightly overhauled in 1984–1986. Some R10s were replaced by the R46s in the late 1970s; the remaining cars, despite having low reliability rates, outlasted several newer car classes. The remaining R10s were replaced by the R68s and R68As and last ran on October 29, 1989. Two cars have been preserved, while the rest were scrapped.

Description
The R10s were originally numbered 1803–1852 and 3000–3349. Cars 1803–1852 were renumbered 2950–2999 in 1970.

As the first series of post-war subway cars, the R10s introduced many innovations. For the first time, the car body was of an all-welded low-alloy high tensile (LAHT) steel construction. This gave the body great strength, as the body and underframe were welded together to form a single, durable, and rigid car body, which had strong structural integrity. The R10s also featured a new type of braking system known as the "SMEE" schedule braking, which introduced dynamic braking. Dynamic braking reduced wear and tear on brake shoes, reducing maintenance costs. They also featured roofline side destination signs, an arrangement that drew criticism. The R10s were also the first subway cars to incorporate roller bearings, instead of the standard friction bearings found on all older railway stock, as well as being the last subway cars ordered with air-operated door engines. Additionally, the R10s were the first subway cars to be equipped with air horns, as opposed to the air whistles that were found on all pre-war subway cars. Finally, the cars introduced the General Steel Industries cast steel truck frame design also used on many passenger cars and coaches up until the R68As in 1988. Sealed beam headlights were installed on all cars of this class starting in 1956.

These cars were nicknamed "Thunderbirds" by their operating personnel and railfans because of the cars' high speeds.

Although the R10s could operate in mixed consists of later SMEE cars, the R10s, for the most part, ran in solid consists throughout their careers. They were briefly mixed with fifty R16s assigned to the A in the late 1950s, and with the R42s assigned to the A during 1969–1970.

The R10s bore several paint schemes during their service lives. The cars were delivered in two-tone grey with orange stripes. In 1964, 9 of these cars were painted red with black roofs and black skirts (1822, 1825, 1850, 3099, 3101, 3137, 3234, 3334, 3342). During the following year, two versions of the original paint scheme were tested, with 3037 in a lighter gray and 3218 in a darker gray. On car 3133, the orange painted-on stripe was replaced by an attached orange plastic strip along the sides of the car. Beginning in 1966, they were repainted into an aqua blue/white scheme, directly replicating that of the WF R33s and R36s. The first car to be so painted, 3331, additionally sported a TA seal on the end. The following year, the fleet was redone in this scheme on this occasion without the extra aqua blue stripe. These cars variously had aqua blue roofs or white roofs; 19 of these cars received gray roofs and gray skirts. Beginning in 1970, they were repainted into the MTA's silver with blue stripe scheme. Toward the end of their lives, 110 Westinghouse units that went under the GOH program were painted with a green body, a silver roof, and a black front hood.

The original interior paint scheme was blue and gray, conducted with various experiments of this nature. While 1848 was all blue inside, 3219 was painted with bright orange and blue around 1964. When the cars were painted with silver and blue outside, the interiors received a light gray and pale green paint scheme (on car 1806, which was 2953 by this time, a dark gray was used). At a later date, the original blue and gray scheme resumed being used once again. The rattan seats also received treatment on certain cars, with 3050 in green coloring, whereas 3210 in a bright blue color.

Other features to be noted were a pair of stainless steel doors that were tested on car 3119, ventilation louvres that were inserted into the side doors on car 3138, and three cross seats that were extended to permit seating by three people on car 3189. These were done during the 1970s.

The R10 was the last B-Division car to have seats that had thick strand woven cloths covering the entire seat.

History

Pre-introduction
In 1947, following an accident in 1946, R7A car 1575 was rebuilt from its original appearance by ACF and became the prototype for the R10. The car was designed to test new interior and cosmetic features. After it was rebuilt, 1575 re-entered service on June 30, 1947; however, while it cosmetically resembled an R10, mechanically and electrically, it was still an R7A and could only operate with other pre-war IND Arnines.

Delivery and revenue service
The R10s first ran in service on the  route on November 20, 1948. They were initially the mainstay, and were exclusively assigned to this train, where they remained for almost 30 years, and became synonymous with that route for more than 20 years. During these early years, they made occasional appearances on the  service (especially on weekends) and the rush hour  service.

Thirty cars #s 3320–3349 were transferred to the BMT Eastern Division in 1954, primarily used on Broadway–Jamaica service to help familiarize crews with SMEE equipment in anticipation of the arrival of the R16 cars, whereupon they were returned to normal IND service.

In 1975, car 3192 had a new R42 type front installed; it was a prototype car for a complete rebuilding of the fleet, which would add modern interiors and air-conditioning. The unit was scrapped in 1980 inside Coney Island Yard and the rebuilding program never took place with the other cars because of the higher cost of rebuilding the cars as opposed to purchasing new cars.

There was a light overhaul program for 110 of the WH-powered cars between December 1984 and February 1986 in an effort to get the entire fleet in a non-graffiti state. The rehabilitation of the select R10s was done in-house at a budgeted cost of $65,000 per car.

Retirement

Approximately 53 R10s were replaced by the R46s in 1977–8. While the remaining cars may have been considered the second worst operating revenue service car during the 1980s based on MDBF (Mean Distance Between Failures), doing better than only the R46s, many R10s outlasted the newer R11s and R16s.

The remaining R10s were replaced by the R68s and R68As. The last train of GE-powered R10s and non-overhauled WH-powered R10s ran on November 10, 1988, ten days short of the 40th anniversary of their debut. This was an official date; some were still operating in service as late as February 1989. On October 29, 1989, a train of R10s (3018-3203-3182-2974-3143-3045-3145-3216) led one final farewell excursion run on various IND-BMT Division routes, including the then-new IND 63rd Street Line.

After retirement, most cars were sent to what is now Sims Metal Management's Newark facility to be scrapped and processed. Most R10s were scrapped by June 1990; the last R10 to be taken off property was 3081, the last GE-powered car in existence. It was scrapped sometime in 1993.

Two cars have been preserved:
 Car 3184 has been preserved by the Railway Preservation Corp. and was previously displayed at the New York Transit Museum. It was repainted into its original two-tone gray and orange striped paint scheme, similar to R7A 1575. The car was restored to operating status in 2017 and has been operating on New York City Transit Museum-sponsored excursions since July 2017, specifically on the Train of Many Metals (TOMM).
 Car 3189 has been preserved by the New York Transit Museum. The car had an experimental 3-passenger transverse fiberglass interior seating installed in 1969, which has since been removed. It was retired from revenue service in 1984, but was later repainted solid blue and used as a training car for road car inspectors at the TA's Pitkin Yard in Brooklyn. The car was restored to operating status in 2022 – during which the car was repainted into the aqua blue/white scheme – and has been operating on New York City Transit Museum-sponsored excursions since September 2022.

References

Further reading

External links

R10 cars at nycsubway.org
They Moved Millions
Picture of R10 train on LL line during 1979-1984 period

Train-related introductions in 1948
R010
American Car and Foundry Company
1948 in rail transport